The 2019–20 Biathlon World Cup – Stage 3 was the third event of the season and is held in Annecy-Le Grand-Bornand, France, from 19 to 22 December 2019.

Schedule of events 
The events took place at the following times.

Medal winners

Men

Women

References 

Biathlon World Cup - Stage 3, 2019-20
2019–20 Biathlon World Cup
Biathlon World Cup - Stage 3
Biathlon competitions in France
Sport in Annecy